Sant Joan de Boí is a Romanesque church situated in the territory of Vall de Boí, a commune in the valley of the same name, in the Province of Lleida in the autonomous community of Catalonia in Spain.

History 
Like Sant Climent, Taüll, Sant Feliu de Barruera, Santa Eulàlia d'Erill la Vall or Santa Maria de Taüll, the date of construction of Sant Joan de Boí is believed to be in the 11th century.

In November 2000, it was declared to be a UNESCO World Heritage Site with eight other Catalan Romanesque Churches of the Vall de Boí.

Architecture

Interior

References 

Churches in Catalonia
Romanesque architecture in Catalonia
Catalan art
Alta Ribagorça
World Heritage Sites in Catalonia
Vall de Boí